The men's combined competition of the PyeongChang 2018 Olympics was held on 13 February 2018 at the Jeongseon Alpine Centre and the Yongpyong Alpine Centre at the Alpensia Sports Park in PyeongChang.

Summary
Marcel Hirscher won the gold medal, with Alexis Pinturault coming in second, and Victor Muffat-Jeandet third. For Muffat-Jeandet, this was the first Olympic medal, and for both Hirscher and Pinturault the first medal in combined. Hirscher, who won six overall World Cup titles and was skiing in his third Olympics, previously only won a silver medal in slalom in 2014.

The defending champion, Sandro Viletta, did not qualify, and the 2014 silver medalist, Ivica Kostelić, retired. The 2014 bronze medalist, Christof Innerhofer, competed and ended at the 14th position. Ted Ligety, the 2015 combined champion, ended fifth. After the downhill, Thomas Dreßen was leading, with Aksel Lund Svindal second and Matthias Mayer third. Svindal decided not to race slalom, and Mayer did not finish. Dreßen posted the 24th time in slalom, which landed him at the 9th position overall. Hirscher was the 12th after downhill and the fastest in the slalom run, which enabled him to win the event. Pinturault came back from the 10th position after the downhill, and Muffat-Jeandet was the 29th after the downhill but posted the second fastest slalom time.

In the victory ceremony, the medals were presented by Willi Kaltschmitt Luján, member of the International Olympic Committee Executive Board, accompanied by Peter Schroecksnadel, FIS council member.

Qualification

A total of up to 320 alpine skiers qualified across all eleven events. Athletes qualified for this event by having met the A qualification standard only, which meant having 140 or less FIS Points and being ranked in the top 500 in the Olympic FIS points list. The Points list takes into average the best results of athletes per discipline during the qualification period (July 1, 2016 to January 21, 2018). Athletes were also required to have 80 or less FIS points in the downhill. Countries received additional quotas by having athletes ranked in the top 30 of the 2017–18 FIS Alpine Ski World Cup (two per gender maximum, overall across all events). After the distribution of B standard quotas (to nations competing only in the slalom and giant slalom events), the remaining quotas were distributed using the Olympic FIS Points list, with each athlete only counting once for qualification purposes. A country could only enter a maximum of four athletes for the event.

Results
The race was started at 11:30 (downhill race) and 15:00 (slalom race).

References

Men's alpine skiing at the 2018 Winter Olympics